Mobo, officially the Municipality of Mobo,  is a 4th class municipality in the province of Masbate, Philippines. According to the 2020 census, it has a population of 40,823 people.

History
Mobo was created as a municipality through Executive Order No. 244 signed by President Elpidio Quirino on July 18, 1949.

Geography

Barangays
Mobo is politically subdivided into 29 barangays.

Climate

Demographics

Economy

References

External links
 [ Philippine Standard Geographic Code]
Philippine Census Information
Local Governance Performance Management System

Municipalities of Masbate
Establishments by Philippine executive order